The Urticaceae  are a family, the nettle family,  of flowering plants. The family name comes from the genus Urtica. The Urticaceae include a number of well-known and useful plants, including nettles in the genus Urtica, ramie (Boehmeria nivea), māmaki (Pipturus albidus), and ajlai (Debregeasia saeneb).

The family includes about 2,625 species, grouped into 53 genera according to the database of the Royal Botanic Gardens, Kew and Christenhusz and Byng (2016). The largest genera are Pilea (500 to 715 species), Elatostema (300 species), Urtica (80 species), and Cecropia (75 species). Cecropia contains many myrmecophytes.

Urticaceae species can be found worldwide, apart from the polar regions.

Description

Urticaceae species can be shrubs (e.g. Pilea), lianas, herbs (e.g. Urtica, Parietaria), or, rarely, trees (Dendrocnide, Cecropia).  Their leaves are usually entire and bear stipules. Urticating (stinging) hairs are often present. They have usually unisexual flowers and can be both monoecious or dioecious. They are wind-pollinated. Most disperse their pollen when the stamens are mature and their filaments straighten explosively, a peculiar and conspicuously specialised mechanism.

Taxonomy

The APG II system puts the Urticaceae in the order Rosales, while older systems consider them part of the Urticales, along with Ulmaceae, Moraceae, and Cannabaceae. APG still considers "old" Urticales a monophyletic group, but does not recognise it as an order on its own.

Fossil record
The fossil record of Urticaceae is scattered and mostly based on dispersed fruits. Twelve species based on fossil achenes are known from the Late Cretaceous of Central Europe. Most were assigned to the extant genera Boehmeria (three species), Debregeasia (one species) and Pouzolzia (three species), while three species were assigned to the extinct genus Urticoidea. A Colombian fossil flora of the Maastrichtian stage has yielded leaves that resemble leaves of the tribe Ceropieae.  In the Cenozoic fossil leaves from the Ypresian Allenby Formation preserve distinct trichomes, and have been attributed to the Tribe Urticeae in the fossil record.  The leaves had originally been identified as Rubus by earlier workers on the Eocene Okanagan Highlands, but Devore et al (2020) interpreted the preserved hairs along the stem and major veins as stinging trichomes, rather than simple hairs or thorns.

Phylogeny
Modern molecular phylogenetics suggest the following relationships (see also ):

Tribes and genera

Boehmerieae Gaudich. 1830
Archiboehmeria C.J. Chen 1980 (1 sp.)
Astrothalamus C.B. Rob. 1911 (1 sp.)
Boehmeria Jacq. 1760 (80 spp.)
Chamabainia Wight 1853 (1–2 spp.)
Cypholophus Wedd. 1854 (15 spp.)
Debregeasia Gaudich. 1844 (4 spp.)
Gibbsia Rendle 1917 (2 spp.)
Gonostegia Turcz. 1846 (5 spp.)
Hemistylus Benth. 1843 (4 spp.)
Neodistemon Babu & A. N. Henry 1970 (1 sp.)
Neraudia Gaudich. 1830 (5 spp.)
Nothocnide Blume 1856 (4 spp.)
Oreocnide Miq. 1851 (15 spp.)
Phenax Wedd. 1854 (12 spp.)

Pipturus Wedd. 1854 (30 spp.)
Pouzolzia Gaudich. 1826 [1830] (70 spp.)
Rousselia Gaudich. 1826 [1830] (3 spp.)
Sarcochlamys Gaudich. 1844 (1 sp.)
Cecropieae Gaudich. 1830
Cecropia Loefl. 1758 (70–80 spp.)
Coussapoa Aubl. 1775 (>50 spp.)
Leucosyke Zoll. & Moritzi 1845 (35 spp.)
Maoutia Wedd. 1854 (15 spp.)
Musanga R. Br. in Tuckey 1818 (2 spp.)
Myrianthus P. Beauv. 1804 [1805] (7 spp.)
Pourouma Aubl. 1775 (>50 spp.)
Elatostemateae Gaudich. 1830 
Aboriella Bennet (1 sp.)
Achudemia Blume 1856 

Elatostema J.R. Forst. & G. Forst. 1775 (300 spp.)
Gyrotaenia Griseb. 1861 (4 spp.)

Lecanthus Wedd. 1854 (1 sp.)
Meniscogyne Gagnep. 1928 (2 spp.)
Myriocarpa Benth. 1844 [1846] (18 spp.)
Pellionia Gaudich. 1826 (60 spp.)
Petelotiella Gagnep. in Lecomte 1929 (1 spp.)
Pilea Lindl. 1821 (250 spp.)
Procris Comm. ex Juss. 1789 (20 spp.)
Sarcopilea Urb. 1912 (1 sp.)

Forsskaoleeae Gaudich. 1830
Australina Gaudich. 1830 (2 spp.)
Didymodoxa E. Mey. ex Wedd. 1857 (2 spp.)
Droguetia Gaudich. 1830 (7 spp.)
Forsskaolea L. 1764 (6 spp.)
Parietarieae Gaudich. 1830

Gesnouinia Gaudich. 1830 (2 spp.)
Parietaria L. 1753 (20 spp.)
Soleirolia Gaudich. 1830 (1 sp.)

Urticeae Lamarck & DC. 1806 
Dendrocnide Miq. 1851 (27 spp.)
Discocnide Chew 1965 (1 sp.)

Girardinia Gaudich. 1830 (2 spp.)
Hesperocnide Torr. 1857 (2 spp.)
Laportea Gaudich. 1826 [1830] (21 spp.)
Nanocnide Blume 1856 (2 spp.)
Obetia Gaudich. 1844 (7 spp.)
Poikilospermum Zipp. ex Miq. 1864 (20 spp.)
Touchardia Gaudich. 1847 (1–2 spp.)
Urera Gaudich. 1826 [1830] (35 spp.)
Urtica L. 1753—nettle (80 spp.)
Zhengyia T. Deng, D.G. Zhang & H. Sun 2013 (1 sp.)
Incertae sedis
Metatrophis F. Br. 1935 (1 sp.)
Parsana Parsa & Maleki 1952 (1 sp.)

Diseases
The Urticaceae are subject to many bacterial, viral, fungal, and nematode parasitic diseases. Among them are:
 Bacterial leaf spot, caused by Xanthomonas campestris which affects Pellionia, Pilea, and other genera
 Anthracnose, a fungal disease caused by Colletotrichum capsici which affects Pilea
 Myrothecium leaf spot, a fungal disease caused by Myrothecium roridum which affects plants throughout the Urticaceae, as well as other angiosperms
 Phytophthora blight, a water mold disease caused by Phytophthora nicotianae which affects  Pilea
 Southern blight, a fungal disease caused by Athelia rolfsii which affects both Pellionia and Pilea

Image gallery

References

Further reading

External links

  continuously updated.

 
Rosid families